The Riveris is an orographically right-hand, southern tributary of the River Ruwer in the German state of Rhineland-Palatinate. The name Riveris is derived from the Latin and means "little river".

Geography 
The stream flows mainly in a westerly direction to the Riveris Dam and then turns northwards. The only settlement that the river flows through is the eponymous village of Riveris. After   the river empties from the right at an elevation of  into the Ruwer. The river descends through 436 metres at a gradient of 32.8 ‰.

See also 
List of rivers of Rhineland-Palatinate

References

External links 
 Riveris Dam

Rivers of Rhineland-Palatinate
Rivers of Germany